Iconoclasts is an American television series that premiered on November 17, 2005 on Sundance Channel. Each episode pairs two "creative visionaries"— often in different fields — who discuss their lives, influences, and art. The series premiered on November 17, 2005 and last aired on November 13, 2012. The series consisted of six six-episode seasons.

Episodes

Season 1 (2005)

Season 2 (2006)

Season 3 (2007)

Season 4 (2008)

Season 5 (2010)

Season 6 (2012)

Other
The show is very similar to Durch die Nacht mit … (German for "Into the night with..."), airing since 2002 on Franco-German television channel ARTE.

Iconoclasts has been parodied by Saturday Night Live (with Kristen Wiig as Björk and Kenan Thompson as Charles Barkley), MadTV, and American Dad! (with Katherine Helmond being paired with Usher, neither of whom know who the other one is).

External links
 
 

2000s American documentary television series
2005 American television series debuts
2012 American television series endings
Sundance TV original programming
2010s American documentary television series